Andy Baker is a New Zealand politician who is an Auckland Councillor. In 2022, Baker was elected as a councillor for the Franklin ward.

Early life

Baker was born and raised in Drury. Before entering local body politics, Baker worked as a policeman, as a dairy farmer, and as a restaurateur, opening the Two Fat Cows bar and restaurant in Drury.

Political career

Turner became an Franklin Local Board member in 2010, serving as the board's chair.

In the 2022 local body elections, Baker ran against former All Black Keven Mealamu, and was elected as the councillor for the Franklin ward.

References

Auckland Councillors
Living people
New Zealand farmers
New Zealand police officers
New Zealand restaurateurs
Year of birth missing (living people)